Josef Hrabal (born 17 August 1985) is a Czech ice hockey player who is currently playing for Czech side Orli Znojmo.

Career 
Hrabal has played in the Czech Extraliga for VHK Vsetín, HC Oceláři Třinec, HC Dynamo Pardubice and HC Vítkovice Ridera. He also played in the Russian Superleague for Severstal Cherepovets, the Swedish Elitserien for Modo Hockey, the Kontinental Hockey League for HC Sibir Novosibirsk and in the Finnish Liiga for Pelicans.

Hrabal was drafted 248th overall by the Edmonton Oilers in the 2003 NHL Entry Draft but never played in the NHL.

Career statistics

Regular season and playoffs

International

References

External links 

1985 births
Living people
Czech ice hockey defencemen
HC Dynamo Pardubice players
Edmonton Oilers draft picks
Czech expatriate ice hockey players in Russia
HC Kometa Brno players
Lahti Pelicans players
Modo Hockey players
HC Oceláři Třinec players
HC Olomouc players
Sportspeople from Přerov
Severstal Cherepovets players
HC Sibir Novosibirsk players
Springfield Falcons players
Stockton Thunder players
HC Vítkovice players
VHK Vsetín players
Sheffield Steelers players
HC ZUBR Přerov players
EC VSV players
Orli Znojmo players
Czech expatriate ice hockey players in the United States
Czech expatriate ice hockey players in Sweden
Czech expatriate ice hockey players in Finland
Czech expatriate sportspeople in England
Czech expatriate sportspeople in Austria
Czech expatriate sportspeople in Hungary
Expatriate ice hockey players in Hungary
Expatriate ice hockey players in Austria
Expatriate ice hockey players in England